First Dude (foaled March 27, 2007 in Florida) is an American Thoroughbred racehorse. He was sired by Stephen Got Even, who in turn was a son of leading sire A.P. Indy. He is out of the mare Run Sarah Run, who is the daughter of Smart Strike. The name refers to the nickname of former First Gentleman of Alaska Todd Palin.

Three-year-old season 

First Dude did not race as a two-year-old. He broke his maiden on January 30, 2010, at Gulfstream Park in a one-mile maiden special weight race that he finished in 1:37 flat with a 77 Beyer speed figure. After that, First Dude placed or showed in seven graded stakes events (6 Grade 1 and one grade 2 race) during the remainder of 2010.

In April, he finished third in the Grade 1 one and one eighth mile Blue Grass Stakes behind Kentucky Derby starters Stately Victor and Paddy O'Prado (also a stablemate trained by Romans) on the synthetic surface at Keeneland Race Course.

On the third Saturday of May, First Dude ran in the Grade 1 Preakness Stakes at 1 mile and 3/16 at Pimlico Race Course. He was listed as a 20-1 long shot on the morning line, breaking from post 11 in a field of twelve. When the gates opened, he rushed to the front and overtook Kentucky Derby winner Super Saver to grab the lead passing the stands for the first time. On the front end, First Dude set some strenuous fractions: 1/4 mile in 22-4/5, 1/2 mile down the back stretch in 46-2/5 and 3/4 of a mile in 1:11-1/5. Around the final turn, both Lookin At Lucky and Caracortado passed First Dude. Then he dug in and fought back to even terms with Lookin At Lucky at the 1/8 pole. In the last 100 yards, Lookin At Lucky pulled in front and won the Preakness Stakes by one length.

In June, First Dude finished third to Drosselmeyer in the Belmont Stakes at 1-1/2 miles in New York. On the first Saturday of August, he finished third to old rival Lookin At Lucky in the Grade 1 Haskell Invitational Handicap at one and one eighth miles at Monmouth Park in New Jersey. On the last Saturday of August, he finished third in the Grade 1 "Mid-Summer Derby" to Afleet Express in the Travers Stakes at one and a quarter miles at Saratoga Race Course. On the last Saturday of September, First Dude finished third to Morning Line in the grade two Pennsylvania Derby at one and an eighth miles at Philadelphia Park.

Four-year-old season 

After a fourth-place finish in his seasonal debut, owner Don Dizney decided to give First Dude "a change of scenery" and moved him to Southern California-based trainer Bob Baffert. First Dude made his first start for Baffert in the Santa Anita Handicap, but finished sixth behind stablemate Game On Dude after battling for the lead.

Baffert then decided to school First Dude and told jockey Martin Garcia to keep First Dude off the pace and let him make his own moves. He was entered in a $58,000 allowance race on April 9 at Santa Anita Park, and won   by more than two lengths.

He then won his second straight race in the Grade 3, $350,000 Alysheba Stakes at one and one sixteenth miles on the dirt at Churchill Downs by a nose on the May 6, 2011, on the Kentucky Oaks undercard. The field for the Alysheba was exceptionally deep, including grade 1 winners Giant Oak and Awesome Gem, multiple grade II winner Mission Impazible (the 5-2 morning line favorite), and grade II winners Caracortado and Regal Ransom.

On July 9, 2011, First Dude won his first Grade 1 race in the Hollywood Gold Cup at Hollywood Park. He was taken off the pace by jockey Martin Garcia and, with a quarter mile left to run, charged from fifth place to a nose victory over stablemate Game On Dude and odds-on favorite Twirling Candy.

Pedigree

References
 Pedigree Profile  for First Dude

2007 racehorse births
Racehorses bred in Florida
Racehorses trained in the United States
Thoroughbred family 3-l